Boophis guibei, sometimes known as the warty bright-eyed frog, is a species of frog in the family Mantellidae.
It is endemic to Madagascar.
Its natural habitats are subtropical or tropical moist lowland forests, rivers, freshwater marshes, intermittent freshwater marshes, and heavily degraded former forest.
It is threatened by habitat loss.

References

guibei
Endemic frogs of Madagascar
Amphibians described in 1978
Taxonomy articles created by Polbot